The TENG Company is a Singaporean non-profit arts company centred around a Chinese chamber music ensemble, The TENG Ensemble. Established in 2004, it became a charity in 2015 and an Institution of a Public Character in 2017. It currently comprises three divisions: performances, music education, and research. In his 2015 National Day Rally speech, Singapore's Prime Minister Lee Hsien Loong mentioned that TENG performers "inject new elements into traditional culture, and created something uniquely Singapore".

Etymology 
The Chinese character  tēng is an ancient word for the sound made by a drum. It is the most complex character in the modern Chinese dictionary.

History 

The TENG Company traces its roots to 2004, when the TENG Chinese Chamber Ensemble participated in that year's National Chinese Music Competition, a biennial music competition organised by the National Arts Council. Following the competition, in which the ensemble emerged first in the Ensemble Category, several of its members including Samuel Wong and Yang Ji Wei founded the TENG Company.

After the competition, a few of The TENG Ensemble's members formed The TENG Company to create and develop projects pertaining to Chinese music. In 2005, it took over the Anglo-Chinese School (Barker Road) Chinese Orchestra, and led it from bronze to gold at that year's Singapore Youth Festival Central Judging. It also advanced the Catholic High School (Primary) Chinese Orchestra from silver to gold with honours between 2010 and 2012. It continues to coach the Chinese orchestras of Raffles Institution, Catholic High School (Primary) and Elias Park Primary School, which attained distinctions at the 2016 and 2017 Singapore Youth Festival Arts Presentations.

Additionally, The TENG Company's premiere project was to commission the book QI: An Instrumental Guide to the Chinese Orchestra, authored by artistic director Dr Samuel Wong, in 2005.

In 2009, The TENG Company staged a tour titled ‘Liu Xing’ (or ‘Popular’) which featured a series of classical Chinese pieces juxtaposed with contemporised Chinese folk songs. In the same year, it was invited to perform at the National Museum of Singapore's Night Festival. As an attempt to create a performance that would resonate better with the younger generation, TENG incorporated electronics in their pieces. Their effort proved to be successful as evident in the great reception from the audience.

Since 2015, the company has been registered as a charity. In the same year, the company received the patronage of Temasek Holdings and the National Arts Council's Seed Grant. The company was also mentioned during the Singapore National Day Rally made by Prime Minister Lee Hsien Loong.

In 2019, the company published The Teng Guide To The Chinese Orchestra, a book which covers the various aspects of 13 sets of Chinese musical instruments and how it worked. The book also analysed 18 Chinese orchestral pieces to demonstrate how to combine various instruments in a orchestral piece. It was written by Samuel Wong, Wang Chenwei and Chow Jun Yi.

Structure 

The TENG Company currently comprises three divisions: performances, music education and research.

Performances 

The TENG Company has two ensembles: the TENG Ensemble, its central ensemble, as well as the QI Ensemble.

The TENG Ensemble 

The TENG Ensemble was formed in 2009. It currently comprises eight members: cello, countertenor, keyboards, erhu, guitar, guzheng, pipa and sheng.

In 2009, the TENG Company began providing chamber music performances through its TENG Ensemble. The ensemble then had six members who play a mix of Chinese and Western instruments, including the pipa, sheng, guitar and cello. The ensemble debuted at the 2009 Singapore Night Festival. Since then, it has also performed at the 2010 Youth Olympic Games, the 2010 Shanghai World Expo, the 2016 Star Awards, the 2017 Singapore Heritage Festival and the President's Star Charity 2017.

Its music draws upon a myriad of music genres, ranging from Singaporean folk songs such as "Chan Mali Chan" and "Munnaeru Vaalibaa", to Western popular influences such as the Snow White and the Seven Dwarfs and Frozen themes. From 2016, the TENG Ensemble released a series of "Evolution" music videos, drawing on Chinese historical drama and Disney themes, and Adele and Teresa Teng's songs.

The ensemble has released two albums, Eight (2013) and Stories from an Island City (2016). Both were rated 4.5 out of 5 stars by The Straits Times, which described the former as "high class easy listening which does not dumb down" and the latter, "a very enjoyable exercise in nostalgia".

The ensemble's debut concert in 2010 was described as "a laudable addition to [the Western and Chinese musical] crossover phenomenon".

The QI Ensemble 

Also in 2013, the TENG Company founded The QI Ensemble, a quartet comprising a mix of Chinese and Western instruments including the pipa, dizi, keyboard and guitar.

In 2016, the QI Ensemble produced a music video, A Tribute to SG Mandopop, a medley of local hits including Mavis Hee's "Iron Window", Kit Chan's "Heartache", Stefanie Sun's "Begin to Understand", Tanya Chua's "Beautiful Love" and JJ Lin's "Cao Cao". It has also performed at the Huayi – Chinese Festival of Arts and Resorts World Sentosa's Chinese New Year festivities.

Education 

The TENG Company's education efforts are housed under the TENG Academy, which provides training, resources and exchanges.

The TENG Academy provides training through administering Chinese music instrumental grading examinations and facilitating the Mapletree-TENG Academy Scholarship. The Chinese music instrumental grading examinations, validated by Nanyang Technological University's Confucius Institute, offers Grades 1 to 8 and a Certificate in Professional Performance. Additionally, in 2018, The TENG Academy and Mapletree Investments launched a scholarship programme, which provides youth with financial assistance for a Chinese music education.

The TENG Academy also provides English-language resources for Chinese music learning. It commissioned textbooks from Singapore musicians, on Chinese and Western instruments in English, to bridge the gap for non-Mandarin speaking learners of Chinese instruments.

The TENG Academy facilitates exchanges between musicians and/or other communities. TENG Gives Back is a series of performances for underserved communities. Under the TENG Mentorship & Volunteer Programme, amateur musicians perform for the community. In the After-School Talent Development Programme, musicians teach students in specialised schools such as Spectra Secondary School.

Research 

In 2005, the TENG Company published QI: An Instrumental Guide to the Chinese Orchestra, authored by Samuel Wong, to create an English language resource for Chinese instrumental music. In 2007, it reprinted the book to serve an international readership. It remains a reference book for the Singapore-Cambridge GCE A-level H2 Music syllabus.

Members

Accolades 

The TENG Chinese Chamber Ensemble, whose several members founded the TENG Company, won first place in the ensemble section of the National Arts Council's 2004 National Chinese Music Competition.

The Straits Times named the TENG Ensemble as a group "breathing new life into music played with traditional instruments", and Lianhe Zaobao described that the ensemble's music "stirs the heart of the listener, making them yearn for more". Hong Kong's Apple Daily has called the ensemble "a formidable Singaporean group", while Malaysia's Oriental Daily News reported that the ensemble's performance "stunned the audience".

The TENG Ensemble was mentioned by Singapore's Prime Minister Lee Hsien Loong in his 2015 National Day Rally speech, who remarked in Mandarin that its performers "inject new elements into traditional culture, and created something uniquely Singapore". Lee has also described the ensemble's music video as "beautiful" and its performance as "delightful".

Discography

The TENG Ensemble 

 Eight (2013)
 Stories from an Island City (2016)

Publications 

 Wong, Samuel (2003), Impressions of a pipa player: profiles of the world's most premier. Ngee Ann Polytechnic and Beaumont Publications. 
 Wong, Samuel (2005), 器 QI: An Instrumental Guide to the Chinese Orchestra. TENG.

References

External links 

 The TENG Company website
 The TENG Academy website

2004 establishments in Singapore
Arts in Singapore
Chinese music
Chinese musical instrument ensembles
Chinese-Singaporean culture
Musical groups established in 2004
Singaporean music
Singaporean musical groups
Overseas Chinese organisations